Sir John Carmichael-Anstruther, 5th and 2nd Baronet (1 June 1785 – 28 January 1818) was a British Member of Parliament for Anstruther-Easter Burghs between 1811 and 1818.

He was the eldest son of Sir John Anstruther of that Ilk, 4th and 1st Bt. (1753–1811) and Maria Isabella Brice. He was educated at Eton and Christ Church, Oxford and admitted to Lincoln's Inn in 1806.

He succeeded to the title of 5th and 2nd Baronet Anstruther, Lanarkshire on the death of his father on 26 January 1811. He inherited the estates of Carmichael and Westraw, Lanarkshire, on the death of his cousin, Andrew Carmichael, 6th Earl of Hyndford on 18 April 1817 and took the additional name of Carmichael.

He died in 1818 from typhus. In 1817 he had married Jessie, the daughter of Major-General David Dewar of Gilston, and had 1 son, John, who was born nine days after his death and who would be fatally shot at Eton school in 1831.

References

External links 
 

1785 births
1818 deaths
Alumni of Christ Church, Oxford
Members of Lincoln's Inn
Baronets in the Baronetage of Great Britain
Baronets in the Baronetage of Nova Scotia
Members of the Parliament of the United Kingdom for Scottish constituencies
UK MPs 1807–1812
UK MPs 1812–1818
John Carmichael, 5th Baronet
Deaths from typhus
People educated at Eton College
English barristers